The Church of la Asunción (Spanish: Iglesia Parroquial de la Asunción) is a church located in Letur, Spain. It was declared Bien de Interés Cultural in 1982.

The church was erected in the late 15th and early 16th centuries. The style is late-gothic or Isabelline Gothic. The main portal is completed in Renaissance style. In the 13th-century, the region was under the rule of the militant knights of the  Order of Santiago. The church was completed by 1536, and attributed to a Juan de Arana.

References 

Churches in Castilla–La Mancha
Bien de Interés Cultural landmarks in the Province of Albacete
15th-century Roman Catholic church buildings in Spain
Roman Catholic churches completed in 1536
Gothic architecture in Castilla–La Mancha
Renaissance architecture in Castilla–La Mancha
16th-century Roman Catholic church buildings in Spain